Spar Nord Bank A/S is a bank based in North Jutland, Denmark.

The history of the bank can be traced back to May 12, 1824, where "Bye og Omegns Sparekasse" (The Savings Bank for Town and County) was established in Aalborg. After a number of merges through the 20th century, the name was changed from "Sparekassen Nordjylland" (The Savings Bank of Northern Jutland) to its current short form.

In the 2010s Spar Nord has opened several offices in larger towns outside Northern Jutland in Denmark. As of 2019, it is Denmark’s sixth largest bank.

References

External links 
 Bank Profile: Spar Nord Bank A/S

Banks established in 1824
Banks of Denmark
Companies based in Aalborg
Danish companies established in 1824